Cindy Mochizuki (born 1976) is a multimedia Japanese Canadian artist based in Vancouver, British Columbia. Through her drawings, installations, performance, and video works created through community-engaged and location-specific research projects, Mochizuki explores how historical and family memories are passed down in the form of narratives, folktales, rituals and archives. Mochizuki's works have been exhibited in multiple countries including Japan, the USA, and Canada. Mochizuki received MFA in Interdisciplinary Studies from the School For Contemporary Arts at Simon Fraser University in 2006. She received Vancouver's Mayor's Arts Award in New Media and Film in 2015 and the VIVA and Max Wyman awards in 2020.

Background 
Mochizuki's grandparents, who settled in the Fraser Valley in Langley as strawberry farmers in the early 1900s. They were uprooted during WWII and forced into Japanese Internment Camps in inner BC from 1942 to 1946. After the war, her family chose to be repatriated to Japan before they return to Canada become a background theme of her works frequently.

Selected projects

Autumn Strawberry 
Autumn Strawberry (Summer 2019) was a research project conducted during Mochizuki's artist residency at Surrey Art Gallery. Including Mochizuki's paternal grandparents, many Japanese Canadians worked in strawberry farms in Fraser Valley, which lands were confiscated by Canadian Government during wartime. The project resulted in a creation of two-channels animated film, which to be shown in 2021.

Shako Club 
Shako Club (2015), or "social club," was a community-based project conducted in Mochizuki's two-months artist residency at Grunt gallery, Vancouver. In collaboration with a Japanese Community Volunteer Association, Tonari Gumi, the project focused on community bonding through cooking and sharing knowledge and story; seniors made unique lunch boxes (bento) that incorporate their personal stories and wellness philosophies. Other members could order those lunch boxes in exchange of gifts to seniors who made those "culinary sculpture."

Open Doors Project 
Open Doors Project (2011) was a public art project taken place at the Powell Street Festival in 2011. Using Japanese card game, hanafuda as a visual inspiration, Mochizuki created sixteen panels as historic reference points of Japanese and Japanese Canadian people and their personal narratives. Each panel was placed each in front of a building, which used to host shops and institutions run by Japanese communities before WWII.

Exhibitions

Selected solo exhibitions

 Autumn Strawberry (2021), Surrey Art Gallery, Surrey, BC
 The Sakaki Tree, A Jewel and The Mirror (2020) - Burrad Arts Foundation, Vancouver, BC
 Cindy Mochizuki: Cave to Dream (2019) - Richmond Art Gallery, Vancouver, BC
 Things on the Shoreline (2017) - Access Gallery, Vancouver, BC

Selected group exhibitions

 Stories that Animate Us (2021) - Vancouver Art Gallery, Vancouver, BC
 Where Do We Go From Here? (2021) - Vancouver Art Gallery, Vancouver, BC
 The Pandemic is a Portal (2020) - SFU Galleries, Vancouver, BC
 To talk to the worms and the stars (2017) - The New Gallery, Calgary, AB
 Absence in Remembrance: The Japanese Canadian Internment (2016) - Franc Gallery, Vancouver, BC curated by Kristine Olson
 To | From BC Electric Railway 100 Years (2010) - Centre A Vancouver International Centre for Contemporary Asian Art curated by Makiko Hara     and Annabel Vaughan

Other projects
 テンサイ (Tensai) by Cindy Mochizuki and Kelty Miyoshi McKinnon, Winnipeg Art Council

Publications

K is for Kayashima: Rock, Paper, Scissors 
This book was created after her research in Yonago, Tottori Prefecture in Japan, where approximately 1,500 people migrated to British Columbia, Canada between 1895 and the onset of the Pacific War. The book contains an essay by a curator, Makiko Hara.

Illustrations 
Mochizuki's illustrations appear in West Coast Line, Front magazine, Alternatives Journal, and other illustrated books, such as Perpetual by Rita Wong and Things on the Shoreline.

References 

1976 births
Living people
Artists from Vancouver
Canadian people of Japanese descent
Canadian multimedia artists
Canadian women artists